Mark W. Lawrence (born 1958) is an American lawyer and Democratic politician currently serving in the Maine Senate. Lawrence represents Senate District 35, comprising the towns of Eliot, Kittery, Ogunquit, South Berwick, York and part of Berwick. Lawrence was born in Kittery and attended Bowdoin College and the University of Maine School of Law where he was elected to his first term in the Maine House of Representatives. He has served a total of three terms in the Maine House and is serving his sixth nonconsecutive term in the Maine Senate, where he served as president from 1996 to 2000. Lawrence was the 2000 Democratic United States Senate nominee, challenging incumbent Olympia Snowe, and in 2008 he unsuccessfully sought the Democratic nomination for Maine's 1st congressional district. Lawrence pursued private law practice for 14 years before becoming the York County District Attorney from 2003 to 2010. In 2010, he returned to private practice and operates the Lawrence Law Firm out of Kittery.

Early life and education
Lawrence grew up in Kittery, Maine. His father, Irving Lawrence, worked at the Portsmouth Naval Shipyard and his mother was a typesetter. He attended Kittery Public Schools and received a Bachelor of Arts from Bowdoin College and a Juris Doctor from the University of Maine School of Law.

Career

Maine legislature
During his second year of law school, Lawrence was elected to the Maine House of Representatives. He served two terms in the House from 1988 until 1992 and four terms in the Maine Senate from 1992 until 2000. Lawrence was elected president of the 118th Maine Senate in December 1996 and president of the 119th Maine Senate in December 1998. In November 2016, he was again elected to the Maine House, and in 2018 he returned to the Maine Senate and was re-elected in 2020.

Congressional runs
Lawrence was the 2000 Democratic challenger to incumbent Olympia Snowe in the 2000 U.S. Senate election, but lost to Snowe 69%-31%. In 2008, he ran for the Democratic nomination for Maine's 1st congressional district but was defeated in the primary.

Law practice
Lawrence spent 14 years in private law practice before being appointed by Maine Governor John Baldacci to replace York County District Attorney Michael Cantara, who had been tapped to serve as the state's public safety commissioner. Lawrence was elected to the position in 2004 and 2006, but withdrew from the 2010 race in July of that year. He returned to private practice and currently operates The Lawrence Law Firm in Kittery.

Personal life
Lawrence lives in Eliot, Maine with his wife Tina and two daughters, Céline and Hayley.

Electoral history

Maine House of Representatives
1988

1990

Maine State Senate
1992

1994

1996

1998

United States Senate, 2000

1st Congressional district, 2008

References

External links
The Lawrence Law Firm
Senator Mark Lawrence on Facebook

1958 births
Living people
20th-century American politicians
21st-century American politicians
County district attorneys in Maine
People from Kittery, Maine
Maine lawyers
Democratic Party Maine state senators
Democratic Party members of the Maine House of Representatives
Minority leaders of the Maine Senate
Presidents of the Maine Senate
University of Maine School of Law alumni